Mika’el Abiy is a tabia or municipality in the Dogu’a Tembien district of the Tigray Region of Ethiopia. The tabia centre is in Megesta village, located approximately 7 km to the southeast of the woreda town Hagere Selam.

Geography 
The tabia stretches down south of the main road towards Rubaksa, which is a wider area with several springs and traditional irrigation.  The highest peak is Gumawta (2815 m a.s.l.) on the Tsatsen plateau and the lowest place Rubaksa (1920 m a.s.l.).

Geology and soils

Geological formations 

From the higher to the lower locations, the following geological formations are present:
 Upper basalt
 Interbedded lacustrine deposits  
 Lower basalt
 Amba Aradam Formation
 Antalo Limestone 
 Quaternary alluvium and freshwater tufa

Soilscape 
The main geomorphic units, with corresponding soil types are:
 Hagere Selam Highlands, along the basalt and sandstone ridge
 Associated soil types 
 shallow soils with high stone contents (Skeletic Cambisol, Leptic Cambisol, Skeletic Regosol)
 moderately deep dark stony clays with good natural fertility (Vertic Cambisol)
 deep, dark cracking clays, temporarily waterlogged  during the wet season (Pellic Vertisol)
 Inclusions
 Rock outcrops and very shallow soils (Lithic Leptosol)
 Rock outcrops and very shallow soils on limestone (Calcaric Leptosol)
 Deep dark cracking clays with very good natural fertility, waterlogged during the wet season (Chromic Vertisol, Pellic Vertisol)
 Shallow stony dark loams on calcaric material (Calcaric Regosol, Calcaric Cambisol)
 Brown loamy soils on basalt with good natural fertility (Luvisol)

 Gently rolling Antalo Limestone plateau, holding cliffs and valley bottoms on limestone
 Associated soil types
 shallow stony soils with a dark surface horizon overlying calcaric material (Calcaric Leptosol)
 moderately deep dark stony clays with good natural fertility (Vertic Cambisol)
 deep, dark cracking clays on calcaric material (Calcaric Vertisol, Calcic Vertisol)
 Inclusions
 Rock outcrops and very shallow soils (Lithic Leptosol)
 Shallow very stony loamy soil on limestone (Skeletic Calcaric Cambisol)
 Deep dark cracking clays with very good natural fertility, waterlogged during the wet season (Chromic Vertisol, Pellic Vertisol)
 Brown to dark sands and silt loams on alluvium (Vertic Fluvisol, Eutric Fluvisol, Haplic Fluvisol) and colluvium (Calcaric Regosol)

Springs 

As there are no permanent rivers, the presence of springs is of utmost importance for the local people. The following are the main springs in the tabia:
 May Zahla in Dingilet
 May Ayni in Rubaksa

Livelihood 
The population lives essentially from crop farming, supplemented with off-season work in nearby towns. The land is dominated by farmlands which are clearly demarcated and are cropped every year. Hence the agricultural system is a permanent upland farming system, and the population are not nomads.

Population 

The tabia centre Megesta holds a few administrative offices and some small shops. The villages close to Hagere Selam (Dingilet and Harena)  have established a new settlement, at the margin of Hagere Selam, where the inhabitants benefit from the proximity of the town. The main other populated places in the tabia are:

Religion and churches 
Most inhabitants are Orthodox Christians. The following churches are located in the tabia:

Legends and myths 
In Megesta, there is a strong story about the Queen of Sheba who was transformed in a snake; the track of the snake is represented by a line of trees up to now. In the northern part of Harena, called Argak'a, there is a large rock of more than 50 m2 - the story goes that a certain Ilias transported it up to there.

History 
The history of the tabia is strongly confounded with the history of Tembien.

Roads and communication 
The main road Mekelle – Hagere Selam – Abiy Addi runs at the north and west of the tabia. Inhabitants mostly move on foot to Hagere Selam from where they can travel further. A rural access road links Hagere Selam to the main villages of Mika’el Abiy.

Schools 
Almost all children of the tabia are schooled, though in some schools there is lack of classrooms, directly related to the large intake in primary schools over the last decades. Schools in the tabia include Selam Seret school.

Tourism 
Its mountainous nature and proximity to Mekelle makes the tabia fit for tourism.

Touristic attractions 
 Dingilet waterfall
 Rubaksa irrigated gardens
 Gumawta peak

Geotouristic sites 
The high variability of geological formations and the rugged topography invites for geological and geographic tourism or “geotourism”. Geosites in the tabia include:

Trekking routes 

Trekking routes have been established in this tabia. The tracks are not marked on the ground but can be followed using downloaded .GPX files.
 Route 10, from Haddush Addi, through T’eshi to Rubaksa (8 km, from the highest to the lowest places in the tabia)
 Route 11, from Megesta, through Harena to Hagere Selam (8 km)
 Route 16, from Rubaksa to Togogwa (7 km)

Inda Siwa, the local beer houses 
In the main villages, there are traditional beer houses (Inda Siwa), often in unique settings, which are a good place for resting and chatting with the local people. Most renown in the tabia are
 Letesillasie Gebrecherkos in Megesta village
 Amit Gebregziabher in Megesta village
 Tsehaynesh Tesfay in Megesta village

Accommodation and facilities 
The facilities are very basic.  One may be invited to spend the night in a rural homestead or ask permission to pitch a tent. Hotels are available in Hagere Selam and Mekelle.

More detailed information 
For more details on environment, agriculture, rural sociology, hydrology, ecology, culture, etc., see the overall page on the Dogu’a Tembien district.

Gallery

References 

Dogu'a Tembien
Populated places in the Tigray Region